Ponerinae is a subfamily of ants in the Poneromorph subfamilies group, with about 1,600 species in 47 extant genera, including Dinoponera gigantea - one of the world's largest species of ant. Mated workers have replaced the queen as the functional egg-layers in several species of ponerine ants. In such queenless species, the reproductive status of workers can only be determined through ovarian dissections.

Description and identification 
They are most easily identified from other subfamilies by possessing a single-node petiole with a constriction before the second gastral segment. They are rare examples of stinging ants. In addition to the sting, they can also be characterized by a single segmented petiole and the constriction of the first and second segment of the gaster. They can also be identified by the shape of their head. Female workers have twelve segmented antennae, whereas male workers have 13 segmented antennae.

Behavior 
These ants typically nest in soil, forest litter, or rotting logs, and are predacious. They primarily prey on isopods. They mostly live in small colonies of up to 200 workers. They can be found mostly in tropical environments, but have been found in southeastern Canada and New York.

Genera
Platythyreini Emery, 1901
Platythyrea Roger, 1863
Ponerini Lepeletier de Saint-Fargeau, 1835
Anochetus Mayr, 1861
†Archiponera Carpenter, 1930
Asphinctopone Santschi, 1914
Austroponera Schmidt & Shattuck, 2014
Belonopelta Mayr, 1870
Boloponera Fisher, 2006
Bothroponera Mayr, 1862
Brachyponera Emery, 1900
Buniapone Schmidt & Shattuck, 2014
Centromyrmex Mayr, 1866
†Cephalopone Dlussky & Wedmann, 2012
Cryptopone Emery, 1893
†Cyrtopone Dlussky & Wedmann, 2012
Diacamma Mayr, 1862
Dinoponera Roger, 186
Dolioponera Brown, 1974
Ectomomyrmex Mayr, 1867
Emeryopone Forel, 1912
Euponera Forel, 1891
Feroponera Bolton & Fisher, 2008
Fisheropone Schmidt & Shattuck, 2014
Hagensia Forel, 1901
Harpegnathos Jerdon, 1851
Hypoponera Santschi, 1938
Iroponera Schmidt & Shattuck, 2014
Leptogenys Roger, 1861
Loboponera Bolton & Brown, 2002
Mayaponera Schmidt & Shattuck, 2014
Megaponera Mayr, 1862
Mesoponera Emery, 1900
†Messelepone Dlussky & Wedmann, 2012
Myopias Roger, 1861
Neoponera Emery, 1901
Odontomachus Latreille, 1804
Odontoponera Mayr, 1862
Ophthalmopone Forel, 1890
Pachycondyla Smith, 1858
Paltothyreus Mayr, 1862
Parvaponera Schmidt & Shattuck, 2014
Phrynoponera Wheeler, 1920
Plectroctena Smith, 1858
Ponera Latreille, 1804
Promyopias Santschi, 1914
†Protopone Dlussky, 1988
Psalidomyrmex André, 1890
Pseudoneoponera Donisthorpe, 1943
Pseudoponera Emery, 1900
Rasopone Schmidt & Shattuck, 2014
Simopelta Mann, 1922
Streblognathus Mayr, 1862
Thaumatomyrmex Mayr, 1887
incertae sedis
†Afropone Dlussky, Brothers & Rasnitsyn, 2004
†Eogorgites Hong, 2002
†Eoponerites Hong, 2002
†Furcisutura Hong, 2002
†Longicapitia Hong, 2002
†Ponerites Dlussky & Rasnitsyn, 2003
†Taphopone Dlussky & Perfilieva, 2014

References

External links

 
Ant subfamilies
Turonian first appearances
Taxa named by Amédée Louis Michel le Peletier
Extant Turonian first appearances